Wirral-Enniskillen is a local service district in the Canadian province of New Brunswick. It is located at the confluence of the Gaspereau and Salmon rivers.

History

Originally settled as Gaspereau and later Gaspereau Station, when it was a flag station on the Canadian Pacific Railway. It was renamed Wirral after the English peninsula of the same name in 1923.

Amalgamated with the former community of Enniskillen, which was among the communities expropriated for CFB Gagetown. It was first settled as Adair Settlement in 1826 by Irish immigrants and renamed Enniskillen after the town in Ireland. It also included the former farming community of Blakely, which merged in 1911.

Demographics

Notable people

See also
List of communities in New Brunswick

References

Communities in Queens County, New Brunswick
Designated places in New Brunswick
Local service districts of Queens County, New Brunswick